Howard is a given name.

Howard may also refer to:

Places

United States
 Howard, Colorado
 Howard, Florida
 Howard, Indiana
 Howard, Kansas 
 Howard, Mississippi 
 Howard, New York
 Howard, Ohio
 Howard, Pennsylvania
 Howard, Rhode Island
 Howard, South Dakota
 Howard, Wisconsin, a village in Brown and Outagamie counties
 Howard, Chippewa County, Wisconsin, a town
 Howard (community), Chippewa County, Wisconsin, an unincorporated community
 Howard City, Michigan  
 Howard City, Nebraska
 Howard County (disambiguation)
 Howard Lake (disambiguation)
 Howard Township (disambiguation)

Other places
 Howard, Queensland, Australia
 Howard Township, Ontario, Canada

Businesses
 E. Howard & Co., a clock and watch company
 Howard Aircraft Corporation
 Howard Publishing, a Christian publishing company

Other uses
 Howard (surname)
 Castle Howard, a stately home in Malton, England
 Howard (skipjack), a Chesapeake Bay fishing boat on the National Register of Historic Places
 Howard Theatre, Washington, D.C.
 Howard University, a historically black university in Washington, D.C.
 Hurricane Howard (disambiguation)
 USS Howard, any of various United States Navy ships
 Howard (film), a 2018 American documentary film about Howard Ashman

See also 
 Heward
 Howard station (disambiguation)
 Howard Springs (disambiguation)
 Howie (disambiguation)